A list of chapters of the Psi Upsilon fraternity.

 Theta, Union College (1833, Inactive since 2014)
 Delta, New York University (1837, reactivated 2010) *Co-ed chapter
 Beta, Yale University (Fence Club) (1839, Inactive since 2006.)
 Sigma, Brown University (1840, Inactive since 1993)
 Gamma, Amherst College (1841, Inactive since 2010) 
 Zeta, Dartmouth College (1842)
 Lambda, Columbia University (1842, inactive)
 Kappa, Bowdoin College (1843, Inactive since 1998)
 Psi, Hamilton College (1843)
 Xi, Wesleyan University (1843) *Co-ed chapter
 Alpha, Harvard University (1850, Inactive since 1873)
 Upsilon, University of Rochester (1858, suspended 2010, reactivated 2013) 
 Iota, Kenyon College (1860, currently Inactive, to be reactivated 2019)
 Phi, University of Michigan (1865, reactivated 2017)
 Omega, University of Chicago (1869)
 Pi, Syracuse University (1875)
 Chi, Cornell University (1876, suspended 2016)
 Beta Beta, Trinity College (1880)
 Eta, Lehigh University (1884)
 Tau, University of Pennsylvania (1891. Known on campus as "Castle")
 Mu, University of Minnesota (1891, Inactive since 1993)
 Rho, University of Wisconsin–Madison (1896, suspended 2021)
 Epsilon, University of California, Berkeley (1902, Inactive since 1998)
 Omicron, University of Illinois at Urbana-Champaign (1910)
 Delta Delta, Williams College (1913, Inactive since 1968)
 Theta Theta, University of Washington (1916)
 Nu, University of Toronto (1920, Inactive since 1997)
 Epsilon Phi, McGill University (1928, Inactive since 1997)
 Zeta Zeta, University of British Columbia (1935)
 Epsilon Nu, Michigan State University (1943)
 Epsilon Omega, Northwestern University (1949, Inactive since 1999)
 Theta Epsilon, University of Southern California (1952, Inactive since 1962)
 Nu Alpha, Washington and Lee University (1970, Inactive since 1974)
 Gamma Tau, Georgia Institute of Technology (1970)  *Co-ed chapter
 Chi Delta, Duke University (1973)  *Co-ed chapter
 Zeta Tau, Tufts University (1981, Inactive since 1992)
 Epsilon Iota, Rensselaer Polytechnic Institute (1982) *Co-ed chapter
 Phi Beta, College of William and Mary (1984, Inactive since 2006, Re-activated 2020)
 Kappa Phi, Pennsylvania State University (1989, Inactive since 1998)
 Beta Kappa, Washington State University (1991, Inactive since 2003)
 Beta Alpha, Miami University (1992, Inactive since 1996)
 Phi Delta, University of Mary Washington (1996)
 Lambda Sigma, Pepperdine University (1998)
 Alpha Omicron, New Jersey Institute of Technology (1999)
 Sigma Phi, St. Francis University (2007)
 Delta Nu, Keene State College (2009, suspended 2020) *Co-ed chapter
 Phi Nu, Christopher Newport University (2010)
 Theta Pi, Georgia State University (2014, Inactive since 2015) *Co-ed chapter
 Tau Epsilon, Clemson University (2018)
 Delta Omicron Provisional, Purdue University *Co-ed chapter

References

https://www.psiu.org/page/chapter

External links
Psi Upsilon Online - official home page

Lists of chapters of United States student societies by society
chapters